John "Jack" Schofield was an English professional footballer who played as a wing half.

References

People from Waterfoot, Lancashire
English footballers
Association football defenders
Bacup Borough F.C. players
Accrington Stanley F.C. (1891) players
Burnley F.C. players
Rossendale United F.C. players
English Football League players
Possibly living people
Year of birth missing